The men's freestyle +97 kilograms (heavyweight) freestyle wrestling competition at the 1962 Asian Games in Jakarta was held from 28 to 30 August 1962.

The competition used a form of negative points tournament, with negative points given for any result short of a fall. Accumulation of 6 negative points eliminated the wrestler. When three or fewer wrestlers remained, they advanced to a final round, with only preliminary results amongst them carried forward.

Schedule
All times are Western Indonesian Time (UTC+07:30)

Results

1st round

2nd round

3rd round

4th round

Final standing

References

External links
UWW Database

Freestyle 98 kg